Tong lau or ke lau are tenement buildings built from the late 19th century to the 1960s in Hong Kong, Taiwan, Southern China, and Southeast Asia. Designed for both residential and commercial uses, they are similar in style and function to the shophouses with five-foot way of Southeast Asia. Over the years, tong lau construction has seen influences of Edwardian-style architecture and later the Bauhaus movement.

Etymology
Tong lau (Cantonese) or tang lou (Mandarin) means "Chinese building" – Tong or Tang refers to the Tang dynasty and is used as a term to mean Chinese, and lau is a building with more than one floor. It is a general term for a type of building found in Hong Kong that also developed in Macau and Canton (Guangzhou) from traditional Southern Chinese townhouses.

Architecture

In Hong Kong's building regulations, tong lau refers to a building with any living space intended for more than one tenant. It is essentially a tenement building for residential and commercial use. The ground floor is reserved for commercial use, mostly by small businesses like retail shops and food vendors. The upper floors are for residential use, and cater to Chinese residents of Hong Kong. 

However, due to the influx of migrants from mainland China to Hong Kong in the 1950s, height control of buildings was relaxed in 1955, and some tong lau that were built after that might have nine or more floors and be built without lifts. The heyday of tong lau ended in the 1960s when population pressure resulted in many tong lau being demolished to make way for high-rise buildings, along with changes in building ordinances in order to allow for such high-rise buildings.

Ke lau or qilou (. meaning "riding building"), is a form of tong lau with an arcade running alongside the road for pedestrian use. The term was originally "kelau with feet", which was first used in Canton's building regulations in 1912, and referred to the columns forming the colonnade that supported the projecting floors that "ride" above. The ke lau buildings developed in Guangzhou were influenced by local traditions and the shophouses with five-foot ways of Singapore, which were first built following the instructions of Stamford Raffles given in his town plan soon after the founding of the colony in the early 19th century. Ke lau were built in Southern China (Guangdong, Guangxi and Fujian) starting in the early 20th century. Most of the ke lau in Guangzhou were built in the 1930s until the outbreak of the Sino-Japanese war, and few were built after that period.

History

Early tong lau

Early Hong Kongese tong lau mainly consisted of two- or three-story structures built back-to-back in areas such as Tai Ping Shan. 19th-century tong lau synthesized Chinese and European architectural features. While the Chinese component was based on building design from southern China, mainly that of Guangdong Province; European influences were usually Neoclassical. The tong lau roof used wood and/or Xieding tiles and iron was used for the balconies. The balcony's design was based on Cantonese styles. Windows used French styling and were made of wood and glass. The upper floors were supported by brick pillars and protruded out to the edge of the street.

Inside, the floors were connected by wooden stairs. Most floors ranged from 450 to 700 square feet with very high ceilings. Top floors were often living quarters for shopkeepers and their family.

Other architectural features of early tong lau are:
 granite capped balustrades
 decorative urns on the roof
 wooden floors and joists
 Canton floor tiles

In 1903, in response to an outbreak of bubonic plague, the Hong Kong government issued a set of new regulations for tong lau so as to improve the living conditions for inhabitants in these buildings. New tong lau buildings needed to have a light well, have larger windows, and the buildings were limited to four floors so their residents can receive sufficient light. The frontage were set at 15 feet, and at the back there needed to be a six-foot lane, so as to remove back-to-back constructions. Roof tiles were also replaced by flat concrete roofs.

In the 1920s, reinforced concrete began to be introduced as the main structural element, which allowed for a veranda as well as cantilevered or recessed balconies to let in extra light. An example of tong lau or ke lau from this period is Lui Seng Chun, a building in reinforced concrete built in Hong Kong in 1931.

After World War II

Tong lau built after World War II were simpler in design:

Iron balconies were replaced with concrete ones and later sealed with windows. Roofs were often flat with an open terrace and later renovated to allow for additional residential space. Wooden windows gave way to stainless steel windows. Air conditioning units were added to the windows in the 1970s and 1980s. Often clothes racks were added below the windows and hung above the sidewalk or street below. Signs were hung on the exterior walls and protruded onto the streets below.

Other features of the new tong lau included:
 mosaic floor tiles
 terrazzo staircase

The postwar boom and influx of immigrants led to a shortage of housing in Hong Kong. Many tong lau were renovated to become rental units. In order to become spacious space, each unit was separated from adjacent units through brick party walls, is between 13 and 16 feet wide (about 4 to 5 m).

The ground floor of a tong lau was used as shop space, but a cockloft was often built on the upper space in front of the partition wall of the kitchen, or utilized as working area. Rooms on the upper floors were divided into smaller rooms and sublet as units by owners; said rooms were only big enough to accommodate bunk beds. The middle of the floor was a common space for tenants to eat and use. Bathrooms and kitchens were also shared among the tenants of each floor. Tenants paid for electricity and water on a monthly basis.

The subletting of floors in tong lau led to changes in housing regulations in Hong Kong.

After the 1960s, many tong lau were demolished to give way to taller apartment and commercial buildings, especially new town or private apartment. Fewer Tong Lau are relatively found in Hong Kong today.

On 29 January 2010, No. 45J Ma Tau Wai Road, Ma Tau Wai, a five-story-tall tong lau of more than 50 years history, suddenly collapsed at approximately 1:43 pm. Four people were killed. Such spontaneous, cascading and complete building collapse in Hong Kong has been quite rare since the Second World War and the incident raised concern of the HKSAR Government and the Hong Kong public towards the safety of the aging tong lau in Hong Kong, especially those built with similar specifications 50 or more years ago.

Location

Mainland China
 

Ke lau styles varied from Chinese to European:
 Gothic Style
 Nanyang (Southeast Asia) Style
 Ancient Roman Gallery Style
 Imitation Baroque Style
 Modernisme　
 Traditional Chinese Architectural Style

Guangdong
Southern China, namely cities in Guangdong Province, is the birthplace of tong lau and ke lau. They were built by wealthy Chinese merchants in the cities like Guangzhou and, with the aid of overseas Chinese, in emigrant market towns like Chikan, Kaiping.

Locations in Guangzhou with Ke lau:
 Renmin Zhong Road (人民中路)
 Renmin Nan Road (人民南路)
 Shangxiajiu Pedestrian Street, including Dishifu Road (上下九步行街)
 Yide Road especially area around the Sacred Heart Stone House Cathedral (一德路)
 Wanfu Road (萬福路)
 Taikang Road (泰康路)
 Xinhua Bookstore of Science and Technology on Beijing Road (北京路)
 Oi Kwan Hotel on Yanjiangxi Road (沿江西路)
 186 Wenming Road (文明路)
 139 Dezheng Nan Road (德政南路)

Hainan and Guangxi
As both Hainan Island and the eastern part of the Guangxi Province lie in the broader Cantonese sphere of linguistical and cultural influence and historically were part of Guangdong, several cities and towns also have this kind of architecture.

Beihai
The city of Beihai lies on the coast in Guangxi. The Old Sheng Ping Street is lined with 'ke lau architecture. Life and trade thrived here in the 19th century. Today it is full of restaurants, souvenir shops and adorned with sculptures and boards with information about local culture.

Haikou
The historical Bo'ai Road area is located in the heart of the Hainan capital city of Haikou. Nearly all the buildings here are of tong lau style. Beginning in 2012, the entire area has been undergoing restoration. It started with Zhongshan Road, now completed and converted into a pedestrian zone. The restoration is currently expanding outward with the facades being replastered and painted. Lights facing toward the facades to illuminate them at night are now installed on many of the buildings. With road repair ongoing, and new, tourist-related businesses replacing the old shops, the entire area is being developed as a visitor attraction.

Chengmai
The southern part of the town of Chengmai, located in Chengmai County, Hainan, has an area adjacent to the Nandu River that consists of numerous, dilapidated tong lau buildings.

Wenchang
The tong lau buildings in the city of Wenchang's "Wennan Old Street" have been completely restored. Unlike Haikou's Bo'ai Road area, the facades are unpainted and are gray in appearance. The area is located downtown and is a visitor attraction.

Puqian
An area within the town of Puqian, mostly consisting of a single street, is lined with tong lau buildings. This street is the main route from the port to the city center. However, the tong lau buildings here are in serious disrepair. In fact, many of them are structurally unsafe.

Macau

Tong lau are also found in Macau on Avenida de Almeida Ribeiro near the Largo do Senado. They are better preserved in Macau, where they did not give way to newer buildings. Upper floors no longer house people and often are assigned for commercial use. Tong lau here often feature Portuguese colonial architectural influences.

Hong Kong
The existence of tong lau was a culmination of a series of historic forces including the economic development of Hong Kong, the Second World War, and the influx of Chinese migrants to Hong Kong.

In 1898, the government introduced a building and public health ordinance which defined all the buildings including tong lau. This explains the general appearance of tong lau. The ordinance changed in 1962; this became fully operative in 1966, and no tong lau was built later.

Tong laus are mainly distributed in the following areas in Hong Kong: Cheung Chau, Kennedy Town, Shek Tong Tsui, Sai Ying Pun, Sheung Wan, Central, Wan Chai, Causeway Bay, Happy Valley, Tai Hang, North Point, Quarry Bay, Sai Wan Ho, Shau Kei Wan, Chai Wan, Aberdeen, Tin Wan, Ap Lei Chau, Stanley, Tsim Sha Tsui, Yau Ma Tei, Mong Kok, Tai Kok Tsui, Sham Shui Po, Cheung Sha Wan, Shek Kip Mei, Hung Hom, To Kwa Wan, Ma Tau Wai, Ho Man Tin, Kowloon City, Wong Tai Sin, San Po Kong, Lok Fu, Tsz Wan Shan, Ngau Chi Wan, Kwun Tong, Ngau Tau Kok, Cha Kwo Ling, Kwai Chung, Tsuen Wan, Tuen Mun, Yuen Long, Tai Wai, Tai Po, Luen Wo Hui, Sheung Shui, Sha Tau Kok, Sai Kung Town, and Tai O.

There are a number of extant tong lau in Hong Kong:

Hong Kong Island

Kowloon

New Territories

See also
 Arcade 
 Five-foot way
 Architecture of Hong Kong
 Lingnan architecture
 Housing in Hong Kong
 Terraced house

References

External links

 
 Conserve and Revitalise Hong Kong Heritage
 Mallory Street/Burrows Street Project
 Heritage enthusiast battles against the wrecker's ball
 Old Qilou Buildings: Historical Architecture in Guangzhou (Part 1)
 Old Qilou Buildings: Historical Architecture in Guangzhou (Part 2)
 Tong Lau: A Hong Kong Shophouse Typology
 Hong Kong's Disappearing Tong Lau (2017) by Stefan Irvine
 A Nostalgic Photo Trip of Tong Lau in Sheung Wan copyright by Canon (2017)

Architecture in China
Architecture in Hong Kong
Macau architecture
Lingnan architecture
Housing in Hong Kong
Apartment types
House types
Cantonese words and phrases